Cornered is a 1924 American silent drama film directed by William Beaudine. The story was filmed again in 1930 as a talkie called Road to Paradise. It was also directed by Beaudine. According to Warner Bros records the film earned $235,000 domestically and $22,000 foreign.

Cast
 Marie Prevost as Mary Brennan / Margaret Waring
 Rockliffe Fellowes as Jerry, the Gent
 Raymond Hatton as Nick, the Dope
 John Roche as George Wells
 Cissy Fitzgerald as Lola Mulvaney
 Vera Lewis as Mrs. Wells
 George C. Pearce as Brewster (as George Pearce)
 Bartine Burkett as The Bride
 Billy Bletcher as The Groom (as Billy Fletcher)
 Ruth Dwyer as Mrs. Webster
 Bertram Johns as Webster
 Wilfred Lucas as Updike
 Virginia Marshall as Mary Brennan / Margaret Waring as a Child

Status
With no copies of Cornered located in any film archives, it is considered to be a lost film.

References

External links

1924 films
1924 drama films
1924 lost films
Silent American drama films
American silent feature films
American black-and-white films
Films directed by William Beaudine
Warner Bros. films
Lost American films
Lost drama films
1920s American films